Luke Jenkins (born 7 October 2002) is an English professional footballer who plays as a defender for Weymouth on loan from AFC Wimbledon.

Career
Previously with Crystal Palace and Sutton United, Jenkins joined AFC Wimbledon in 2019 and went on to make his first-team debut during an EFL Trophy group-stage tie in October 2021 against former side, Crystal Palace U23s, featuring 53 minutes in the 2–0 defeat. On 9 November 2021, he made a subsequent appearance, once again coming in the EFL Trophy, replacing Darius Charles in the 61st minute during Wimbledon's 1–0 defeat to another former side of Jenkins', Sutton United.

On 16 December 2021, Jenkins joined National League South side Tonbridge Angels on a one-month loan deal.

Career statistics

References

External links

2002 births
Living people
English footballers
Association football defenders
Crystal Palace F.C. players
Sutton United F.C. players
AFC Wimbledon players
Tonbridge Angels F.C. players
English Football League players